Lev Konstantinovich Knipper (Russian: Лев Константинович Книппер;  – 30 July 1974) was a Soviet and Russian composer of partial German descent and an active OGPU/NKVD agent.

Life and career

Lev Knipper was born in Tiflis to railway engineer Konstantin Leonardovich Knipper and Elena-Luiza Yul’evna Rid. Shortly after his birth, the family relocated to Tsarskoye Selo, then to Yekaterinoslav in 1910, and then Saint Petersburg in 1913. He was greatly influenced by his father's sister, the actress Olga Knipper (wife of the playwright Anton Chekhov), who encouraged his musical interests. He learned to play clarinet, double bass and various brass instruments, and taught himself to play piano out of a book.

Knipper enlisted in the White Army in 1916. Following the Russian Civil War of 1917, he became stranded in Turkey, though was eventually able to reunite with his aunt Olga, who was touring abroad. Upon his return to Soviet Russia in 1922, he was repeatedly interviewed and ultimately recruited by the OGPU foreign department. At their behest, Knipper travelled to Germany in 1922–23, where he made the acquaintance of composers Alois Hába, Philipp Jarnach, and Paul Hindemith. Hindemith's music in particular had a strong influence on Knipper's own compositional language.

Through the connections of his aunt, Knipper made the acquaintance of Elena Gnesina, who hired him as building administrator at the Gnessin Music School in Moscow. Though Knipper was too old to be officially admitted as a student, he was nonetheless able to study with Reinhold Glière and Nikolai Zhilyayev. He wrote his first catalogued composition, the orchestral suite Сказки гипсового божка (Tales of a Plaster God), op. 1, in 1923, a work musicologist Larry Sitsky characterizes as "harsh and chiseled," and somewhat grotesque. Inspired by sculptures of the Buddha by Pavel Tchelitchew, the six-movement suite premiered on 8 March 1925 and was well-received by audiences and critics. Fellow composer Leonid Sabaneyev approached Knipper at the premiere and asked for a copy of the score. In 1929, Knipper was invited by Vladimir Nemirovich-Danchenko to work as a consultant at the Moscow Art Theatre. This led to the creation of Knipper's most significant work of this early period, his 1930 opera Северный ветер (The North Wind), op. 25, based on the play by Vladimir Kirshon. Musicologist Gerald Abraham describes the opera as "harmonically sophisticated, dry, [and] more than a little Hindemithian." The opera is also noted for its defiance of typical operatic conventions. The North Wind received a total of seventy-eight performances, mostly in Moscow, but following harsh criticism from the Russian Association of Proletarian Musicians it was not staged again until 1974.

Seemingly in response to criticism of his modernist early works, Knipper resigned his post as technical secretary to the Association for Contemporary Music (two years before it was officially disbanded) and abruptly shifted his style towards one more in line with the principals of socialist realism. In 1930–1931, he travelled to Central Asia to study the region's folk music. The music of Tajikistan was apparently a source of great inspiration for him: his list of works reveals eight explicitly Tajik-inspired compositions. The majority of Knipper's works from this period are musically conservative and patriotic and militaristic in tone, most notably his "song-symphonies" (3, 4 and 6). The most notable of these is his Fourth Symphony, "Поэма о бойце-комсомольце (Poem of the Komsomol Fighter)," op. 41 (1934), with lyrics by Viktor Gusev dedicated to Kliment Voroshilov. The central theme of the symphony, the song Полюшко-поле, has become Knipper's most famous work as one of the marching songs of the Red Army Choir. Though in line with Soviet political ideals, these song-symphonies were met with criticism by some of Knipper's fellow composers: Dmitri Shostakovich, for one, lambasted Knipper's Third Symphony (1932) for its "primitiveness" at a meeting of the Union of Soviet Composers in 1935 (fortunately for Shostakovich, this criticism did not deter Knipper from coming to his defense following the famous public denunciation of Shostakovich's opera Lady Macbeth of Mtsensk in 1936). Dmitry Kabalevsky pointed out the shortcomings of Knipper's approach to combining mass-songs and the surrounding symphonic material. In his Sixth Symphony, op. 47 (1936), Knipper apparently veered too close to his earlier style and was publicly rebuked for it; his Seventh Symphony "Military" (1938) returned to an ideologically safer style.

Knipper continued to compose during the Second World War, though much of his time was devoted to extensive travel for the NKVD, which he continued to serve until 1949. According to secret intelligence documents released in 2002, Knipper and his wife were to play a key role if the Nazis should capture Moscow: Under the elaborate plan, ballerinas and circus acrobats were armed with grenades and pistols and ordered to assassinate German generals if they attempted to organize concerts and other celebrations upon taking the city. Knipper was personally charged with the responsibility of killing Adolf Hitler if he got the opportunity, an opportunity the NKVD suspected might arise due to Knipper's sister, Olga, having social connections with high-ranking Nazis, including Hermann Göring.

Knipper was prolific. He wrote 5 operas (including one on The Little Prince), 20 symphonies, ballets, pieces for piano and other film musics.

The primary publishers of Knipper's works are Muzyka, Kompozitor and Le Chant du Monde. Most of his published compositions are currently out of print, and the majority of his output has yet to be published.

List of works

Symphonies 
Symphony No. 1 in 4 parts, Op. 13 (1926) - dedicated to Olga Knipper
Symphony No. 2, Op. 30 (1929)
Symphony No. 3 "Far East," Op. 32 (1932) - poetry by Viktor Gusev
Sinfonietta, Op. 33 (1932)
Symphony No. 4 "Poem for the Komsomol Fighters" (1934, rev. 1966) - poetry by Viktor Gusev
Symphony No. 5 (1935)
Symphony No. 6, Op. 47 (1936)
Symphony No. 7 "Military" in 3 parts (1938)
Symphony No. 8 in 3 movements (1941)
Symphony No. 9 in 4 movements (1944–45)
Symphony No. 10 in 4 movements (1946) - dedicated to Nikolai Myaskovsky
Symphony No. 11 in 4 movements (1949)
Symphony No. 12 in 3 parts (1950)
Symphony No. 13 in 4 parts (1951–52) - dedicated to Nikolai Myaskovsky
Sinfonietta in 4 movements (1952)
Symphony in 4 movements (1954)
Symphony No. 14 for string orchestra in 4 parts (1961–62)
Symphony No. 15 (1962)
Symphony No. 16 (1962–69)
Symphony No. 17 in 3 movements (1969–70)
Symphony No. 18 (1970–71)
Sinfonietta for string orchestra in 4 movements (1971–72)
Symphony No. 20 in 3 parts (1972)
Symphony No. 21 "Dances" in 5 parts (1972)

Concertante
Violin
 Souvenir: Six pieces for violin and symphony orchestra, op. 31 (1932)
 Three Variations on a Theme for violin and symphony orchestra, op. 31a (1932)
 Concerto No. 1 (1942–44) - dedicated to Olga Knipper
 Sonatina for violin and string orchestra (1948)
 Concertino for violin and string orchestra (1962)
 Little Concerto in Classical Style (1964–65) - dedicated to Arkady Futer
 Concerto No. 3 (1969–70) - dedicated to Leonid Kogan
Viola
 Concerto (1962)
Cello
 Concerto-Monologue for cello, seven brass instruments and timpani (1962) - dedicated to Mstislav Rostropovich
 Concerto-Poem for cello and chamber orchestra (1971) - dedicated to Natalia Shakhovskaya
Woodwinds
 Clarinet Concerto (1967) - dedicated to Rafael Bagdasarian
 Concerto-Suite for oboe, string quartet and percussion (1968) - dedicated to Konstantin Paustovsky
 Concerto for bassoon and string orchestra (1969–70) - dedicated to Valery Popov
Brass
 Four Improvisations & Finale for horn and string orchestra (1971)
Double concertos
 for violin, cello and orchestra (1945)
 for violin, cello and wind septet (1967) - dedicated to Tatiana Alekseevna Gaidamovich
 for trumpet and bassoon (1968)
String quartet
 Radif: Suite in Iranian style for string quartet and string orchestra (1944)
 Concerto for string quartet and orchestra (1963)
 Symphonic Concerto for string quartet and symphony orchestra (1964–65)

Chamber music
 Reflections: Six sketches for flute and clarinet, op. 11 (1925)
 To my Son: Four miniatures, op. 27 (1931) - dedicated to Andrei L'vovich Knipper
 Four Pieces for violin and piano (1943)
 String quartets
 No. 1 (1943) - dedicated to the Bolshoi Quartet
 Six Miniatures on Kirghiz Themes (1956)
 No. 2 (1962)
 No. 3 (1972–73) - dedicated to N. M. Skuzovatova
 Concert Scherzo for violin and piano (1962)
 Pieces for flute and harp (1963)
 Piano trios
 No. 1 (1968–71) - dedicated to Tatiana Alekseevna Gaidamovich
 No. 2 (1971–73) - dedicated to Tatiana Alekseevna Gaidamovich
 Concert Etude for flute and trumpet (1971)
 Scherzo for flute, trumpet and piano (1971)

Film music
 The Private Life of Pyotr Vinogradov (1934)
 The Red Cavalry (1935)
 The Soviet Coast (documentary, 1951)
 Immortal Pages (documentary, 1965)

Honors and awards
 Order of the Badge of Honour
 Stalin Prize - 1946 and 1949 
 People's Artist of the RSFSR - 1974

References

External links 
 List of Works
 Life and Work 
Stalin Planned to Destroy Moscow
 Beevor, Antony (2004) The Mystery of Olga Chekhova 

1898 births
1974 deaths
20th-century classical composers
20th-century Russian male musicians
Musicians from Tbilisi
People from Tiflis Governorate
Gnessin State Musical College alumni
People's Artists of the RSFSR
Stalin Prize winners
Male opera composers
Russian male classical composers
Russian opera composers
Soviet male classical composers
Soviet opera composers